The Marr & Colton Company was a producer of theater pipe organs, located in Warsaw, New York. The firm was founded by David Jackson Marr and John J. Colton. The company built between 500 and 600 organs for theatres, churches, auditoriums, radio stations, and homes.

History 

David Marr was born in London in 1882. He served seven years as an apprentice in an organ building firm in Edinburgh, where he learned every phase of pipe organ construction. In 1904, he moved to the United States where he acquired employment with the Skinner Organ Company in Boston. He later worked for the Hope-Jones Electric Organ Company, owned by Robert Hope-Jones, who made many initial innovations in the development of the Unit Orchestra, later to become known as the Theatre Organ. While working for Hope-Jones, Marr met John Colton.

The Hope-Jones firm was eventually sold to the Wurlitzer Company in
North Tonawanda, New York, and David Marr and John Colton joined the Wurlitzer team. For two-and-one-half years, David Marr worked for Wurlitzer, ultimately becoming factory superintendent.

Tempted by the prospect of operating his own company, Marr opened the Marr and Colton Organ Company in Warsaw, New York, in 1915. John Colton was with the new company from the beginning, but contrary to popular notion, did not invest any money in the new organization.

The first theatre organ produced by the company was for the Oatka Theatre in Warsaw. At the height of its operation in the 1920s, the company had branch offices in New York City, Detroit, and Hollywood, and some 375 people were employed by the firm. David Marr would often attend the opening of a new theatre in which one of his instruments was installed. Occasionally, he would do the final tuning in the theatre before the grand opening.

The company's largest organ was a 5-manual, 24-rank, which was installed in the Rochester Theatre, in Rochester, New York in 1927. The theatre was demolished in 1964, and the organ sold.

At the start of the Great Depression of the early 1930s, sales for the
Marr & Colton Company began to decline rapidly.

In 1932, John Colton left the firm to join the Kilgen Organ Company in St. Louis as a salesman, and died shortly after. Operations ceased at the Warsaw plant in the fall of 1932. David Marr set up a shop in his home cellar and garage, performing organ repair work. He serviced organs in churches and homes until he died on December 20, 1951.

Current organ installations 
This list is incomplete. You can help by expanding it.

 Ohio Theatre, Toledo, Ohio
 Clemens Center, Elmira, New York
 Arcada Theater Building, St. Charles, Illinois
 The Chevalier Theatre, Medford, Massachusetts
 The Jane Pickens Theater & Event Center, Newport, Rhode Island  www.janepickens.com
 The Grand Theater, East Greenville, PA www.thegrandtheater.org/history
 Thomaston Opera House, Thomaston, CT
 Methodist Church, Bolivar, NY

Former organ locations
 Leow's Rochester Theatre, Rochester, New York
 Capitol Theater, Wheeling, West Virginia
 Roosevelt Theater 887 Broadway (4/18), Buffalo, New York
 Saint Patrick Catholic Church, 721 Main St, Watsonville, California, 95076 (2 manuals; replaced in 1974 with a new 2-manual instrument by the Wicks Organ Company; some, but not a lot, of the original pipes were incorporated into the Wicks Organ.)
 Palace Theatre, Danbury, CT
 Immanuel Lutheran Church, Bristol, Connecticut, (installed 1930, replaced in 1974-75 by a new three manual instrument from Austin Organs.) Some ranks from the church's Marr and Colton organ survived removal and are currently installed in the organ at the Thomaston Opera House, Thomaston, Connecticut.

References

External links
American Theatre Organ Society

Companies based in New York (state)
Musical instrument manufacturing companies of the United States